Euphorbia aphylla is a species of flowering plant in the family Euphorbiaceae. It is native to the Canary Islands. It was first described in 1809.

Description
It has slender leafless stems. The virtually stemless flowers are produced in small clusters at the end of the stems. Very small light brown or reddish fruits enclose small brown seeds.

Distribution and habitat
Euphorbia aphylla is native to the Canary Islands. It is found on the north coast of Gran Canaria, being locally frequent near the sea. In Tenerife, it is also coastal, occurring in the north west and the south of the island. It also occurs in La Gomera.

References

aphylla
aphylla
Endemic flora of the Canary Islands
Plants described in 1809